Man-machine interaction (MMI) may refer to:

Control of machines in general using devices like steering wheel, automobile pedal, or button
Human–computer interaction